Harakh Chand Nahata  (18 July 1936 – 21 February 1999) was a prominent Indian businessman and social leader.

Early life
Nahata was born in Bikaner, Rajasthan on 18 July 1936. His uncle, Agar Chand Nahata, and elder brother, Bhanwar Lal Nahata, were acknowledged authorities on Prakrit literature, Jain canonical literature and scriptures. The family has a private collection of more than 85,000 books, manuscripts, works of arts etc. at Abhay Jain Granthagar in Bikaner. His family has more than 175 years of business presence in the field of trading and distribution in Assam, Meghalaya, West Bengal, Calcutta, Tripura and the former East Bengal (now Bangladesh).

Nahata completed his schooling at Bikaner and his college education in Calcutta.

He died on 21 February 1999 in New Delhi, after a brief illness.

Business and trade

Tripura Town Out-Agency
Nahata was the first person to start road transportation in the difficult and inhabitable terrain of
Tripura. Handling the largest Railway Out agency in Tripura (Tripura Town out Agency) and establishing a large network of road transport at heavy costs and risks, he was instrumental in starting economic development and two-way traffic to bring economic gains for the tribal people and the state of Tripura.

Technicians' studio
Nahata contributed a lot for the development of cinema in Eastern India through his Technicians Studio. Calcutta, with which many internationally acclaimed directors like Satyajit Ray, Hritwik Ghatak & Basu Bhattacharya etc. were associated. Later, he turned a film financier and realtor. He encouraged many upcoming artists of films and performing arts with his advice, help and patronage. He was a connoisseur of art and literature and secretly helped many budding artists, poets and writers. He spotted talents of writers and published many books at his own cost to encourage them including a Hindi monthly magazine.

For his multi-faceted contributions to trade and industry, Nahata was honoured with awards by the Vice President of India and Lieutenant-Governor of Delhi.

Social contributions
He was a well-known social leader and philanthropist, associated with more than 60 socio-religious organizations and Trusts like Heart Care Foundation of India, Shanti Mandir-Bithari, Prakrit Bharati, Rishabhdev Foundation, Veerayatan, Rajasthan Bharati, Shri Ambika Niketan Trust, Ahimsa International, Shri Jain Mahasabha. Bharat Jain Mahamandal, Vishwa Jain Parishad and many others in different capacities. From (1990 onwards) he was the President of Akhil Bhartiya Shree Jain Shwetamber Khartargachha Mahasangh, the apex national representative body of thousands of Jains of this sect.

Commemorations

On 1 March 2007, the wrestler, actor and member of the Rajya Sabha, Dara Singh, opened Harakh Chand Nahata Marg, a road that interconnects three villages of South-West Delhi, namely Nanakheri, Badusarai and Raghopur. Nahata's family is in the process of developing a Farmhouse Scheme in that area by the name of Westyn Park.

In a ceremony held on the occasion of Mahavir Jayanti on 31 March 2007, Hema Malini, an actor, dancer and member of the Rajya, unveiled a bust of Nahata at Mahabalipuram Teerth, Village Bhatti, New Delhi.

A commemorative 5-rupee stamp was released by Shri S. C. Jamir, Governor of Maharashtra, on Shri Harakh Chand Nahata on 28 February 2009 in Mumbai to honor his selfless service to society and India.

On 28 September 2013, a 100 feet wide, 2km prominent road connecting National Highway 89 to Rani Bazaar Industrial Area was named "Harakh Chand Nahata Marg" to honor him and his contributions.

1936 births
1999 deaths
Businesspeople from Rajasthan
Businesspeople from Delhi
Rajasthani people
20th-century Indian Jains
Social leaders